Scott Wedige  (born November 20, 1988) is a former American football Center. He signed with the Arizona Cardinals as an undrafted free agent in 2012. He played College football at Northern Illinois.

College career
He was a second team All-American selection and also was a co-winner of the NIU Offensive Lineman of the Year award after his senior season.

Professional career

Arizona Cardinals
On April 30, 2012, he signed with the Arizona Cardinals as an undrafted free agent. On August 31, 2012, he was released.

New York Giants
On September 7, 2012, he was signed with the New York Giants to join the practice squad. On September 17, 2012, he was released from the practice squad.

Cincinnati Bengals
On November 6, 2012, he signed with the Cincinnati Bengals to join the practice squad.

Second Stint with the Arizona Cardinals
On November 26, 2012, he was signed from the Cincinnati Bengals practice squad to join the Arizona Cardinals active roster after the team placed Center Lyle Sendlein on Injured Reserve to a torn MCL injury. On August 19, 2013, he was released by the Cardinals.

New York Jets
On August 20, 2013, he was claimed off waivers by the New York Jets to serve as backup behind veteran pro bowl center Nick Mangold. He was released three days later.

Second Stint with the Cincinnati Bengals
On December 3, 2013, he signed with the Cincinnati Bengals for the second time.  He was waived on April 28, 2014.

References

External links
Northern Illinois bio
Arizona Cardinals bio

1988 births
Living people
People from Elkhorn, Wisconsin
Players of American football from Wisconsin
American football centers
Northern Illinois Huskies football players
Arizona Cardinals players
New York Giants players
Cincinnati Bengals players
New York Jets players